This is a list of the Maryland state historical markers in Queen Anne's County.

This is intended to be a complete list of the official state historical markers placed in Queen Anne's County, Maryland by the Maryland Historical Trust (MHT). The locations of the historical markers, as well as the latitude and longitude coordinates as provided by the MHT's database, are included below. There are currently 29 historical markers located in Queen Anne's County.

References 

Queen Anne's County